Anders Erik Johannes Schröder (born 1990) is a Swedish politician representing the Swedish Green Party, Miljöpartiet. He is a member of parliament for Gävleborg and in that position he is suppleant in the Committees for traffic, agriculture and law (Swedish: Trafikutskottet, Miljö- och jordbruksutskottet and Justitieutskottet).

References

External links 
 Anders Schröder

Green Party (Sweden) MEPs
Living people
1990 births